William Franklin Lee III, aka Bill Lee (20 February 1929 Galveston, Texas; d. 23 October 2011 New Smyrna Beach, Florida) was an American jazz pianist, composer, arranger, author, and music educator who was renowned for pioneering comprehensive music education, including jazz, at the collegiate level. He led the University of Miami School of Music and was the University of Miami's third music school dean from 1964 to 1982. 

In 1989, Lee retired from the University of Miami but continued to work in music education at other institutions. He was distinguished professor emeritus of music theory and composition and emeritus composer in residence. Lee was vice-president and provost at the University of Miami and president and executive director of IAJE.

His son Will Lee played bass guitar for Late Night with David Letterman and Late Show with David Letterman.

Early life and education
Lee graduated from Kirwin High School, Galveston in 1945. He obtained a bachelor's degree in music in 1949 and a master of science degree in 1950, both from the University of North Texas College of Music. In 1956, he obtained a master of music degree in composition and a PhD in music school administration from the University of Texas at Austin.

When Lee received his masters of science at the University of North Texas in 1950, he was a member of the largest graduating class in the history of university as of that date. His studies at North Texas exposed him to Wilfred Bain, dean of the North Texas College of Music, and Gene Hall, who, in 1947 introduced at North Texas the first college degree in jazz studies. Lee began his studies at North Texas in 1945. By 1946, he was a member of the Beethoven Choir conducted by Bain, the symphony orchestra, and the Aces of Collegeland directed by Fessor Graham.

Timeline as educator
 1951–52: Director of Bands at Kirwin High School, Galveston, Texas
 1952–55: Professor of Music, St. Mary's University, San Antonio
 1952–55: Special Music Instructor in the San Antonio Independent School District
 1953: Summer faculty, Trinity University, San Antonio
 1954: Distinguished lecturer, San Antonio College
 1955–56: Instructor of Theory and Assistant to the Dean of Fine Arts, University of Texas at Austin
 1956–64: Professor of Theory-Composition and Director of the Music Department at Sam Houston State University, where he began the jazz studies program
 1964–82: Third Dean of the School of Music, University of Miami School of Music
 1972–74: Co-founder and president of NAJE
 1982–86: Executive Vice President and Provost, University of Miami
 1986–1989: Distinguished Professor and Composer-in-Residence, University of Miami
 1988: Inducted into the IAJE Jazz Educators Hall of Fame
 1989–90: Director of Fine Arts at Florida International University
 1990–1994: Dean of the College of Fine Arts and Humanities at the University of Texas at San Antonio
 1994–95: Professor of Music, the University of Texas at San Antonio
 1995–99: Executive Director of IAJE

Selected published works
 Music Theory Dictionary, compiled and edited by William F. Lee, Huntsville, Texas, (1961)
 Music Theory Dictionary: The Language of the Mechanics of Music, compiled by William F. Lee, C. Hansen Educational Music and Books (1966)
 The Nature of Music, a Guide to Musical Understanding and Enjoyment, C. Hansen Educational Music and Books, Denver (1968)
 Stan Kenton: Artistry in Rhythm ed. by Audree Coke Kenton, Creative Press of Los Angeles (1980)
 People in Jazz: Jazz Keyboard Improvisors of the 19th & 20th Centuries Columbia Lady Music, Hialeah, FL, distributed by Columbia Pictures Publications (1984)
 MF Horn: Maynard Ferguson's Life in Music, The Authorized Biography, Sunflower University Press (1997)

Music compositions
 Concerto Grosso for brass quintet and orchestra
 Earth Genesis for string orchestra
 Alamjohoba for band
 Introduction and Fugue for band
 Time After Time for band
 Suite for brass for brass choir
 Four Sketches for Brass C. H. Hansen (c1969)
 Fanfare for Ralph for brass choir
 Piece for Brass for brass quintet
 Mosaics for brass quintet
 Regimentation for brass quintet
 Nocturne for flute and piano
 Soliloquy for horn and piano
 Mini-Suite for trumpet and piano
 Three Reflections for alto saxophone and piano
 Interlude for guitar
 Tone Poem for oboe, violin, viola, 2 celli
 Two Woodwind Quintets
 Piano Pieces

See also
 List of jazz arrangers

References

1929 births
2011 deaths
20th-century American composers
20th-century American pianists
American jazz bandleaders
American jazz composers
American jazz educators
American jazz pianists
American male pianists
American music arrangers
Educators from Texas
Jazz arrangers
Jazz educators
Jazz musicians from Texas
American male jazz composers
People from Galveston, Texas
University of North Texas alumni
University of Texas at Austin College of Fine Arts alumni
20th-century American male musicians
20th-century jazz composers